Nakamoto (中本, 中元, etc.) is a Japanese surname. Notable people with the surname include:

 Himeka Nakamoto (born 1996), Japanese mental health counselor, former Japanese idol and former member of Nogizaka46, older sister to Suzuka Nakamoto
 Hiroshi Nakamoto (born 1966), Japanese baseball player
 , Japanese freestyle skier
 Kentaro Nakamoto (born 1982), Japanese long distance runner
 , Japanese comedian
 Kuniharu Nakamoto (born 1959), Japanese football player
 Lynn Nakamoto (born 1960), Japanese American judge
 Miriam Nakamoto (born 1976), Japanese American Muay Thai fighter
 Mitsuaki Nakamoto (born 1954), Japanese handball player in 1984 olympics
 Satoshi Nakamoto, the pseudonymous creator of the bitcoin digital currency
 Shuhei Nakamoto (born 1957), vice-president of Honda Racing
 Suzuka Nakamoto (born 1997), Japanese singer, former member of Karen Girl's and Sakura Gakuin; frontwoman of Babymetal; younger sister to Himeka Nakamoto
 Takako Nakamoto , Japanese novelist
 Yuta Nakamoto (born 1995), Japanese singer active in South Korea, member of boy group NCT 127

People with the given name
 Tominaga Nakamoto (born 1715), Japanese philosopher

Japanese-language surnames